Liakat Ali Khan (1955 – 25 September 2019) was an Indian politician belonging to Bharatiya Janata Party. He was elected as a member of the Assam Legislative Assembly from Chenga
two times.

Biography
Khan was born in 1955. He was elected as a member of the Assam Legislative Assembly in 1991 from Chenga as an Independent candidate. He supported Indian National Congress to form government in Assam. He was appointed the chairman of Agro Industry Board by Assam Government. Later he joined Indian National Congress.

After a few years Khan joined Asom Gana Parishad. He was elected as a member of the Assam Legislative Assembly in 2006 from Chenga as an Asom Gana Parishad candidate. Before assembly election in 2016 he joined All India United Democratic Front. He left this party and joined Bharatiya Janata Party in 2017 where he served as an executive member of the state unit.

Khan died on 25 September 2019 at the age of 64.

References

Bharatiya Janata Party politicians from Assam
2019 deaths
Assam MLAs 1991–1996
Assam MLAs 2006–2011
1955 births
Indian National Congress politicians from Assam
Asom Gana Parishad politicians
All India United Democratic Front politicians